Ormetica pallidinervis is a moth of the family Erebidae. It was described by Walter Rothschild in 1935. It is found in the Brazilian state of Santa Catarina.

References

Ormetica
Moths described in 1935